The Dancehouse is a dance centre at 10 Oxford Road, Manchester, England. Formerly, the dance house was the Regal Cinema.

History and description
The building which now houses the Dancehouse Theatre, on Oxford Road, Manchester, was originally designed by Pendleton and Dickson for the property developer Emmanuel Nove, a Ukrainian who came to the city in the late 19th century. The building was built in 1929-30  originally containing two large meeting halls over a parade of shops. Before the interior of the halls was completed, they were converted into two cinemas (The Regal Twins) with fashionable 1930 Art Deco interiors, the world's first multiplex. These were converted, in 1972, to a five screen complex (Studios 1 to 5) by Star Group, as the first five-cinema complex in Britain. before closing in the 1980s. Star Group also established Studios 6-9 in Deansgate.

A lease for the derelict property was obtained in 1990 by the Northern Ballet School which, together with its sister company The Dancehouse Theatre, set about restoring the building to its former Art Deco splendour. One previously derelict 750-seat cinema was converted to create the Dancehouse Theatre, officially opened in 1994 by Princess Margaret. The next four cinemas and other areas of the building were converted into the five dance studios and associated facilities that now house the Northern Ballet School.

The £500,000 cost of converting the theatre was largely met by donations from the Foundation for Sport and the Arts, the Arts Council of England and many other subscribers to the company's development programme.

Trivia

Local band Elbow filmed the video to "Newborn" here. The theatre was supposed to be underwater so all extras were asked to wear blue.

See also

Listed buildings in Manchester-M1

References

External links

 Official website

Theatres in Manchester
Art Deco architecture in England
Former cinemas in Manchester